Toughie may refer to:

 Toughie (frog), the last surviving member of the species Rabbs' fringe-limbed treefrog
 Toughie Brasuhn (1923-1971), American roller derby skater
 Toughie, a character in the Bazooka Joe comics